Aljama is a term of Arabic origin used in old official documents in Spain and Portugal to designate the self-governing communities of Moors and Jews living under Christian rule in the Iberian Peninsula. In some present-day Spanish cities, the name is still applied to the quarters where such communities lived, though they are many centuries gone.

The Jewish communities of Spain, owing to their social isolation and to the religious and political regulations imposed upon them, had always formed groups apart from the rest of the population. The authority exercised by their own rabbis and the system of tax-collection by the heads of the congregations for the administration of communal affairs, placed them almost completely without the jurisdiction of the government of the country; and, as a result, they soon came to be dealt with by the officials not as subjects amenable to the general law of the land, but as collective bodies with special privileges and special duties.

Thus, the Visigothic kings imposed a tax not upon each individual Jew or upon the heads of families, but upon the community as a whole, allowing the communal authorities to fix the individual rate of taxation. But both under the Visigoths and under the Moors there was neither regularity in the transactions of the rabbis and elders nor system in the attitude of the government toward the Jewish communities. With the reestablishment of Christian rule, however, the relation between the government and its Jewish subjects gradually became a well-defined one.

In 1219 and 1284 in Toledo, in 1273 in Barcelona, in 1290 at Huete, and on more than one occasion during those years in Portugal, councils were held of Spanish officials and Jewish representatives for the purpose of establishing a just rate of taxation for Jewish communities, and of devising adequate means for tax-collection. This first official recognition by the government of the Jewish communities as separate bodies led to a still further change in the treatment of the Jewish congregations and in the legislation, both local and national, regarding them.

The bishops of the various districts assumed immediate authority over them, and, in conjunction with Jewish representatives, formed rules which were henceforth to govern the communities. The elections of rabbis and judges were to be held at stated intervals, and the names of these dignitaries submitted to the bishop for approval; there was to be a Rabino mayor (Rab de la corte; "court rabbi") for the presentation of communal questions before the proper authorities; and the heads of the congregation were made answerable for the conduct of the community. In all government action, whether local or general, the unit considered was in most cases the community, not the individual Jew.

The governing authority of the state sometimes nominated a member of the Jewish community to the administrative position of crown rabbi to act as intermediary between the aljama and the state. There were various requirements as to the good character and faith of the person holding the position, as well as a requirement that he live among the entourage of the Court, and thus away from his community, and in constant contact with the Christian majority population.

Etymology and development of the concept

The word aljama comes from Arabic and refers to the Jama Masjid of a Muslim community, where believers pray Jumu'ah, the communal Friday prayer.

The word aljama is derived from the Arabic jama ("gather") plus the definite article al. It originally meant "congregation", "assembly", "group", but was, even before the establishment of Spanish rule, applied by the Moors to their own religious bodies and the larger mosques, and especially to the Jewish communities in the midst of them, and to the synagogues and schools which formed the center of all Jewish life. The term was adopted by the Christians, and its meaning extended so as to designate also the quarters that Jews and Moors had made their own. In some Spanish cities, the former Jewish quarters are still known by that name, even though the Jews were expelled in 1492.

Very often, for purposes of distinction, such phrases as Aljama de los Judíos ("Aljama of the Jews") and Aljama de los Moros ("Aljama of the Moors") were used. But the circumstance that the Moors of Spain had by the term designated more especially the Jewish community has left its trace in the use of the word in the Spanish language; for in Spanish literature Aljama, without any further specification, stands for Sanedrin or for Judería ("Jewry"), or even for the Jewish place of worship, in the concrete as well as in the abstract sense. This use occurs at a very early date. In the "Poem of Alexander", in the "Milagros de Nuestra Señora", and in the "Duelo de la Virgen" of Gonzalo de Berceo, all of the 13th century, Aljama or Alfama is employed to designate the people of ancient Jerusalem; and the historian of the 16th century, Mariana, uses Aljama for the synagogue: "they devastated their houses and their aljamas."

Tecana of Valladolid

A good example of how much self-government was granted to the Jewish Aljamas is afforded by the "resolution of the meeting", in Spanish called  (from takkanah, תקנה, a Hebrew word that, like sanedrín, has been incorporated into the Spanish language) arrived at by the Aljama of Valladolid in 1432. This report is written partly in Hebrew, and partly in Spanish with Hebrew characters, and is preserved in the Bibliothèque Nationale at Paris ("Fonds Hébreux," No. 585).

From this document it is learned that, at Valladolid, electoral meetings were held by the community every ten years, and that the particular meeting of which an account is given in the document took place in the latter part of Iyar (end of May) and lasted for ten days. The following were some of the matters decided or discussed: 
 The necessity of the Talmud Torah, or Hebrew school, and the rate of taxation for the maintenance of the same, which was decided upon as follows: five maravedis for each of the cattle killed, and one for each sheep; five maravedis for every flask of wine. Five maravedis were also to be paid by a married couple on the day of their wedding, and by a boy on the day of his bar mitzvah. A certain tax was also laid upon inheritances, and various other means of revenue were devised. In connection with this question the employment and salary of private or itinerant teachers were discussed. 
 The election of the judges and of the rab de la corte (rabbi of the court), to which much space is accorded in this . 
 The attitude of the individual Jew in his relations with the state. This was by far the most important question discussed. Since permission to decide civil and criminal cases before Jewish judges had been granted by the Spanish government, and since "the Christians, though they be well versed in law, know nothing of Jewish laws," no Jew might plead before a Christian judge, whether religious or civil, except in cases where the taxes and imposts due to the ruler were in litigation, or where special permission was obtained from the dayyan, or chief judge of the Aljama. A Jew who arrested another Jew with the aid of a Christian was to be apprehended by the dayyan; for a second offense of the same nature, he was to be branded on the forehead and expelled; while the third offense was made punishable by death.

This ability to impose a capital punishment in indicative of how wide was the Jewish community's autonomy.

Derived words
From aljama are derived:
Aljamado, adjective and noun, the inhabitant of an aljama.
Aljamía, the Spanish vernacular used by the Jews or Moors, but more especially the Spanish or Mozarabic language written with Hebrew characters by the Jews, and with Arabic letters by the Moors
Aljamiado (adjective and noun), one who speaks or knows the Aljamia.

Similar unrelated words
Spanish Alhama and Portuguese Alfama derive from Arabic hammam, "baths".
Arabic Ra’s al-Galut meaning exilarch.

References

Sources
 
 William Milwitzky Aljama, in the Jewish Encyclopedia. That article, in turn references:
 Francisco Fernandes y Gonzales, in Boletín de la Real Academia de la Historia, vii. 156 et seq.; 
 F. Fita, "Acta de Toma de Posesión de Una Aljama Israelita", in Ilustración Católica, Nov. 21, 1880.
 Diccionario de la Real Academia Española.
aljama. There is a homonymy with a different etymology meaning "mosque".
aljamía.

Christianity and Judaism
Islam in Spain
Jewish Spanish history
Jewish self-rule